The history of Trieste began with the formation of a town of modest size in pre-Roman times, which became an actual city only after Roman conquest in the second century BC and subsequent colonisation. After the imperial era, the city declined following barbarian invasions, becoming only marginally important for the next millennium. It changed lordships several times and then became a free city, which joined the House of Habsburg in 1382. Between the 18th and 19th centuries Trieste experienced a new period of prosperity thanks to the free port and the development of a thriving shipping industry that made it one of the most important cities of the Austrian Empire (since 1867 Austria-Hungary).

The cosmopolitan city, which in the Habsburg period remained Italian-speaking and rose to become a leading Italian and European cultural center, was incorporated into the Kingdom of Italy in 1922 following the First World War. After the Second World War it was the capital of the Free Territory of Trieste, staying for nine years under Allied Military administration. Following the 1954 London Memorandum, Trieste was annexed by Italy. Since 1963 it has been the capital of the Friuli-Venezia Giulia.

Prehistory to Middle Ages

Pre-Roman and Roman
The location of today's city of Trieste and the Karst Plateau in its hinterland was first occupied by permanent settlers in the Neolithic period. In the Late Bronze Age traces of the pre-Indo-European Castellieri culture have been found in the area. According to historical record, the first groups of Indo-Europeans appeared in the 10th century BC, the Histri people. The foundation of the first nucleus of what would become the Roman town of Tergeste has been attributed to the Adriatic Veneti, as evidenced by the Venetic language roots of the name ("Terg" and "Este") and other important findings. Greek historian Strabo, however, attributed the foundation of Tergeste to the Gaulish tribe of Carni, who settled the Eastern Alps in classical antiquity.

Following the Roman conquest of Istria in 177 BC the town became a Roman municipality called Tergeste, developing and acquiring a clear urban physiognomy by the Augustan Age at the beginning of the 1st millennium. Roman Tergeste reached its peak during the rule of Trajan in the early 2nd century AD. According to Triestine historian Pietro Kandler, the town's population at the time was around 12,000 to 12,500, a number the city reached again only in the 1760s.

In the lower part of the San Giusto hill in the city's historic centre it is still possible to see the remains of the ancient Roman settlement, despite the many modern buildings that partially cover the view today. Two buildings stand as a clear testimony of the importance of Tergeste in Roman times: the theatre, dating from the end of the 1st century BC (and later expanded under Trajan), with a capacity for about 6,000 spectators; and the early Christian basilica, built between the 4th and 5th centuries, which contains some superb mosaics, a clear sign of the prosperity enjoyed by the local church and the city of Tergeste well into the late imperial period of Roman history.

The remains of Roman temples dedicated Jupiter and Athena, also built on the San Giusto hill, are also still visible. The latter has been preserved in the form of architecture structures built into the foundations of the Trieste Cathedral, identified from the outside through openings in the walls of the cathedral's bell tower, and also under ground (accessible through the building of the Municipal Museum of History and Art). Another ancient Roman monument which has survived in fairly good condition to this day is the Roman Arch, an ancient city gate built in the second half of the 1st century BC. Remains of Roman villas owned by local nobility have also been found in Barcola, Grignano, and other settlements along the coast, mostly built in the 1st and 2nd centuries AD.

Of crucial importance for the development of Tergeste in Roman times was Via Flavia, the road connecting it with Pola (present-day Pula, Croatia) along the coast of Istria, which was built during the reign of emperor Vespasian, in 78–79 AD. Tergeste also had a seaport and a series of small-scale harbours along the coast: at the San Vito promontory; at Grignano, near several patrician villas; at Santa Croce, etc.). The water needs of the city at the time were met by two aqueducts, one to nearby Bagnoli and the other to San Giovanni di Guardiella.

From barbarian invasions to free municipality
After the anarchy which paralysed the entire region after the fall of the Western Roman Empire, Trieste was first part of the Kingdom of Italy ruled by Odoacer, and then by his successor Theodoric the Great. During the Gothic War (535–554) it was occupied by Justinian I, who turned the town into a military colony of the Byzantine Empire. A few years later the city was destroyed by the Lombards (in 568, at the time of their invasion, or, more likely, in 585). Rebuilt in the following decades, but now greatly reduced in size, the town then passed on to the Franks in 788, whose sovereignty was recognized by Byzantine emperors in 812.

During the 8th century, the missionary work of priests of the Bishopric of Salzburg and the Patriarchate of Aquileia led to the Christianisation of the local Slavic communities, who were allowed by the Franks since the early 9th century to settle into the depopulated areas of the Istrian peninsula, up to the northern areas in the vicinity of Trieste, as documented in the Placitum of Risano.

In 948 Lothair II of Italy gave the government of the city to Bishop John III and his successors, which from that moment on began to enjoy considerable autonomy, while still preserving feudal ties with the Kingdom of Italy. Throughout the bishops' rule the city was forced to defend itself against expansionist ambitions of the powerful patriarchs of Aquileia, Venice and later the Counts of Gorizia. The bishops' rule was in crisis around the middle of the 13th century: the incessant wars and quarrels, especially with Venice, had emptied the city coffers, forcing the bishops to get rid of some important prerogatives related to rights which were sold to citizenship. Among the latter, judicial rights, the collecting of tithe and the right to mint coins. The city therefore developed a civil administration, dominated by the elders of the city, which gradually took the place of the church. This process culminated in 1295, when bishop Tittel de Toppo formally renounced his last prerogatives and fully relinquished the government of Trieste to the local community, officially establishing Trieste as a free municipality.

Trieste and the Habsburgs: from the free city to international port

Austrian orbit of influence
After becoming a free city, Trieste had to face new and increasingly powerful pressures, of both military and economic nature, from the Republic of Venice, which sought to impose its hegemony in the Adriatic Sea. The disproportion in terms of demographics, financial and military means between the two cities portended Trieste's rapid fall under Venetian influence and the loss of its independence as had already happened previously in many Istrian and Dalmatian urban centres. In 1382, yet another dispute with Venice resulted in a Venetian siege of Trieste which lasted 11 months, and the occupation of Trieste by the Venetians from November 1369 to June 1380. The constant struggle to resist Venetian influence eventually led the city to place itself under the protection of the Duke of Austria who was committed to respecting and protecting the integrity and civic freedom of Trieste (the latter were largely downsized from the second half of the 18th century).

Creation of the free port and city development
In 1719 Charles VI of Austria created in Trieste a free port whose privileges were extended during the reign of his successor, before the District Chamber (1747), then to the entire city (1769). After the emperor's death (in 1740) the young Maria Theresa of Austria acceded the throne, and thanks to a careful economic policy enabled the city to become one of the main European ports and the biggest in the Empire. The Theresian government invested considerable capital in expanding and upgrading the city port. Between 1758 and 1769 preparation for defense buildings were made, and a fort was created. In the immediate vicinity of the port rose the Stock Exchange (inside the Municipal Palace, around 1755), the Palace of the Lieutenancy (1764), as well as a department store and the first shipyard in Trieste, known as the shipyard of Saint Nicholas. In those years began to be built a whole neighborhood, which still bears the name of the Empress (Theresian), to accommodate a population that in the city was increasing in frequency and that at the end of the century would reach about 30,000 inhabitants, six times greater than that in the hundred years before.

The significant population growth of the city was due, for the most part, the arrival of numerous immigrants coming mainly from the Adriatic basin (Istrian Venetian, Dalmatian, Friuli, Slovenia) and, to a lesser extent, from continental Europe (Austria, Hungarian) and the Balkans (Serbs, Greeks, etc.).
Serbs settled Trieste largely in XVIII and XIX century, mostly from Herzegovina and Bay of Kotor. Even though small in numbers, they soon formed an influential and rich community within the city. A number of Serb traders owned important business and had built palaces across Trieste, many of which still stand.

Trieste was occupied three times by the troops of Napoleon, in 1797, in 1805 and 1809, when it was annexed to the Illyrian Provinces; in these short periods the city lost definitively the ancient autonomy with the consequent suspension of the free port status. Returned to the Habsburgs in 1813 Trieste continued to grow, thanks to the opening of the railroad to Vienna in 1857. In the 1860s it was elevated to the rank of the state capital of the Austrian Littoral region (Oesterreichisches Küstenland). Subsequently, the city became, in the last decades of the 19th century, the fourth biggest urban area in the Austro-Hungarian Empire (after Vienna, Budapest and Prague).

Commercial and industrial development of the city in the second half of the nineteenth century and the first 15 years of the next century (30,000 employees in the secondary sector in 1910) led to the birth and development of some pockets of social exclusion. Trieste at the time had a high infant mortality, higher than that of the Italian cities and one of the highest tuberculosis rates in Europe. Those factors further deepened the already increasing gap between the countryside, populated mostly by ethnic Slovenes, and the city proper, with its Italian language and traditions.

Ethnic and linguistic groups in the Habsburg age
In the Middle Ages and up to the early 19th century inhabitants of Trieste spoke Tergestina, a Rhaeto-Romance dialect, although the primary language used for all official purposes and in culture was Latin throughout the Middle Ages. At end of the medieval period (14th and 15th centuries) usage of Italian language started to spread (although spoken as mother tongue, by a small minority of people in Trieste), and later still, in the latter part of the 18th century, German became more widely used, although it was confined to the purely administrative sphere.

After the establishment of the free port and the beginning of the great migration that began in the 18th century, demographic changes intensified further in the next century (with a clear predominance of the Venetians, Dalmatians, Istrians, Friuli and Slovenes), and Tergestina gradually lost ground to Venetian language. If the first is imposed primarily as a written language and culture, the second spread, between the last decades of the 18th and early 19th century as a real lingua franca in Trieste. Among linguistic minorities acquired considerable weight in the city in the second half of the 19th century, the Slovenian (present in Carso since medieval times), that on the eve of World War represented about a fourth of the total population of the Municipality.

Thanks to its privileged status of only commercial port of some importance in Austria, Trieste continued always to maintain the centuries close cultural and linguistic ties with Italy. In fact, despite the official language of the bureaucracy, which was German, Italian, already a language of culture since the late medieval era, was imposed in the last period of the Habsburg sovereignty in all formal contexts, including business (both on the stock market and in private transactions), education (in 1861 an Italian school was opened by the city, joined to the existing Austro-German school), written notice (the vast majority of publications and papers were drawn up in Italian), finding its own space even in the municipal council (the political class in Trieste was mostly Italian-speaking).

According to the contested Austrian census of 1910, out of a total of 229,510 inhabitants of the city of Trieste (also including a number of locations in the center and surrounding plateau) occurred as a result of the revision, the following distribution on the base of the tongue of use:
118,959 (51.8%) spoke Italian
56,916 (24.8%) spoke Slovenian
11,856 (5.2%) spoke German
2,403 (1.0%) spoke Serbo-Croatian
779 (0.3%) spoke other languages
38,597 (16.8%) were foreign nationals who had not been asked for the language of use, including:
29,639 (12.9%) were Italian citizens
3,773 (1.6%) were Hungarian citizens.

Of the total population surveyed, well 98,872 inhabitants (43%) were not born in the municipality of Trieste but in other territories placed under Austrian sovereignty (71,940 registered inhabitants, i.e. 31.3%) or abroad (26,842 registered inhabitants, 11.7%). Among the latter the most part was born in the Kingdom of Italy (the "subjects of the Kingdom") and, among the first, the most numerous colonies came from Gorizia and Gradisca (22,192 registered inhabitants), from Istria (20,285 inhabitants surveyed), Carniola (11,423 registered inhabitants) and Dalmatia (5,110 registered inhabitants).

Trieste from 1861 to World War I
The national contrasts

The political and national struggles of Trieste in the period between 1861 and 1918 were the subject of a very large series of studies by historians of different nationalities. The interpretations and historiographical visions of this period are not always consistent with each other and the debate remains open, at least in a number of aspects and problems. It appears undeniable that was sixty years marked by strong tensions. Ernesto Sestan highlights, in this period the dual action of defense put forward by the Italian-speaking population, and in relation to the Viennese bureaucratic centralism, both against the spread of the Slavic population. The two phenomena, in fact, especially during the ministry Taaffe (1879–1893) were sometimes concurrent, since the central government considered the most reliable Slavs. At the time it was a widespread fact that the so-called Austro-Slavism, a political trend by which the Slavic-speaking populations aimed to achieve its national objectives within the Habsburg regime and with his own cooperation.

Government policies towards Trieste

The dynamic city of Trieste were found packed in this period of time by the different policies adopted by the central Viennese power towards the local institutions and the national question. As early as February 1861 the imperial government had issued a license that reduced the autonomy of individual diets, with the aim to proceed to a centralization and Germanization of the administration of the empire. The decision provoked reactions in Trieste, from which provenne request to ensure the autonomy of the city, of which he remarked on the Italian ethnic character. This centralist policy was accompanied, especially after the third war of independence of 1866 and, in general, the process of creation of the Italian state, by a general distrust or hostility toward Italian ethnic populations present in the empire, and their faithfulness to the Austrian State and the Habsburg dynasty: "the events of 1866 but strengthened in many Austrian politicians (among military leaders, conservative aristocracy and the imperial family) old suspect infidelity and the danger element Italian and Italophile for the Empire. [...] After 1866 the distrust of the conservative sectors of the ruling class towards Italians Habsburg of Austria began to result in deliberate hostility. "

Emperor Franz Joseph, in his Privy Council of 12 November 1866, a few months after the end of the Third War of Italian Independence and its annexation of the Veneto and Friuli to the highest part of the Kingdom of Italy, imposed a policy to "... Germanise and Slavonians in the strongest terms and without scruple ...» all Italian regions still part of his empire: Trentino, Dalmatia, Venezia Giulia. The minutes of the Habsburg Ministers Council of 12 November 1866, with the directives of "Germanization and Slavonians", is well known by historians, who have frequently cited it in their works. It is reported by a number of independent essays among them, made by scholars from different countries and in different years, which have provided different interpretations on the possible outcomes and applications.

Writes historian Luciano Monzali: "The minutes of the Council of Ministers of the Habsburg end of 1866 show the intensity of the hostility anti-Italian emperor and the nature of its political guidelines in this regard. Franz Joseph was converted fully to the idea of the general element infidelity Italian and Italian-speaking towards the Habsburg dynasty in the Council of Ministers, November 2, 1866, he gave strict orders to oppose the influence of decisive way ' Italian element still present in some Kronländer, and aim for Germanization or slavicized, depending on the circumstances, of the areas in question with all the energy and without any regard [...] all central authorities were ordered to do so systematically . These anti-Italian sentiments expressed by the emperor, who would have had serious political consequences [...] in the following years, were also particularly strong in the army, which had fought many wars in Italy and was eager for revenge: considered the preponderant role of the military [... ], it was extremely dangerous. "[11] so it was designed and developed the" ... floor of the Austrian conservative ruling class to pursue a policy of concessions to the nationalities slave, considered most loyal to the Empire and well prepared to accept the power dominant Habsburg emperor and aristocracy. "

The loss of the greater part of Friuli, especially the Veneto (with their ports and qualified maritime personnel), further increased the economic and strategic importance of Trieste for the empire, which had in the main cities Julian its maritime and commercial outlet, prompting the central state to pay special attention to its development and the expansion of its infrastructure. This policy, inaugurated by Austria after the third war of independence, was inspired by the traditional choices, followed since the beginning of the eighteenth century, to foster the potential of the geographical position of Trieste, located roughly at the meeting point between the converging lines of communication from Italy, Central Europe and the Balkans.
He took care apparatus that moved from the large road and rail inland towards the city and the port, in order to ensure the best possible circulation of goods and people in the double entrance and exit direction. Attention to the city by the central government also s'espresse in the choice of imperial lieutenants, who were usually chosen from among prominent personalities.
The traditional maritime sector, i.e. commercial, gradually joined by even industrial one which received impetus from the naval armament policy promoted by the imperial government since the end of the century XIX in competition with the neighboring kingdom of Italy and the prospect of a Balkan expansion . The massive investments intended for naval rearmament of course privileged Trieste own government, which had the appropriate physical facilities and personnel to carry out the proposed works. The result was that the Trieste industry, especially in sectors such as steel and shipbuilding in the strict sense, experienced a great expansion. In this partial national economic order metamorphosis also it contributed to the decision taken by the imperial authorities in 1891 to restrict the traditional customs duty (in practice dating as far back as 1719, the date of the granting of so-called free port) to one port area and not all 'entire city.
Trieste was also a significant administrative and financial center, both for the capital that s'accumulavano with commerce or who flocked to foreign investors, and because it had become headquarters already in 1850 the establishment of the so-called maritime Central Government. It was a body which regulate and control the administrative unit of the Austrian Littoral activities related to trade in its various aspects.
A significant link between Vienna and Trieste was made by Lloyd. In fact, two crucial sectors of the economy in Trieste, those of shipping and insurance, had an important landmark in the Austrian Lloyd, since it was the company able to link together public and private capital, as well as Viennese entrepreneurship and Trieste.
Trieste therefore met, in the final decades of the nineteenth and early twentieth century, a great economic development, favored by a number of conditions: the historical context consisting of the European economy momentum and intensity of world maritime trade which, after the opening of the Suez canal, lived their golden age; the presence of an active urban fabric and on average qualified; public investment and the close trade ties with an expanded Central European hinterland propitiated by the network infrastructure. [13]

Tensions and political conflicts, both internal and in Trieste, Trieste is between the municipality and the central government, there were years in which Prince Konrad Hohenlohe was the imperial governor of the region (1904–1915), since he was a supporter of the so-called tribalism and followed a filoslava policy. The trialism was a political project supported by Archduke Franz Ferdinand of Austria-Este (designated heir to the throne of Francis Joseph and made regent, at the time, given the late emperor's age), which aimed to create a third kingdom empire, next to those of Austria and Hungary: the Danube Slavia, that would also have included Trieste and the Austrian Coast. Indeed, it was the will of the Austrian Government '... to weaken the powers and the political and economic strength of the city of Trieste checked by the national-liberal Italian, rightly considering the heart of the national liberalism in Austria and irredentist tendencies ". This also included the severing of "... close political, cultural and social among liberals Trieste and Italy.."

The school problem

An issue that aroused strong interest and sometimes great passions was to school, because the teaching was seen as an essential form of transmission and preservation of the national culture. The imperial educational system was quite complex and differentiated, as intended for a multiplicity of ethnic groups enclosed in the same state. Simplifying for brevity, you can present the following distinction for the city of Trieste in the period: there were primary schools where teaching was held in familiar language (paternal or maternal language) or better in the so-called endeavored use of language routinely by students, but who foresaw the obligation of German as a second language; Then there were secondary schools, which had to Trieste as a teaching language or the language used by the majority of the population and by the educated class and the business (Italian) or the official language of the empire and administrative (German). The complexity was increased by the existence of state and municipal schools, institutions with parallel sections with a different language of instruction and again by the substantial number of hours spent in some institutions in certain languages (Italian, German, Slovenian), but as a matter of ' learning rather than as the language of instruction.
The imperial authorities tried to spread as much as possible to teaching in German and, in part, also Slovenian. The same textbooks were subjected to strict censorship, with results even paradoxical as, in some cases, the study of Italian literature of texts translated from the German or the prohibition to study the same story of Trieste, because it was deemed "too Italian". For these reasons, the Italian National League had, among its main objectives, the promotion of scholarly and educational institutions for the cultural defense of the Italian ethnic group.
In Trieste, between 10 and 12 July 1868, there were demonstrations for subsequent academic freedom in a petition signed by 5,858 citizens and presented to the illustrious city council, which demanded the right to use the Italian language in state schools. These demonstrations degenerated into clashes and violence in the main city streets, with local Slovenes enlisted among the Habsburg soldiers, which caused the death of Rodolfo Parisi student, killed 26 bayonets and two workers Sussa Francis and Nicholas Zecchia. A witness to the character turned hired by the school problem, it should be remembered that there were even more violent clashes. In 1913 there was a slight scuffle at the High School of Commerce Pasquale Revoltella between Italian and Slavic students, tied to a language issue. The Slovenian company Balcan university decided to intervene, in theory in protest, so a few days later (13 March 1913) there were other clashes, a far greater gravity to the previous ones, which caused the death of an Italian student hit by a bullet during a shootout.
Another point of school problem which caused bitter divisions was the request to allow the establishment of an Italian university in Trieste. The question had been put forward since 1848 and had become more pressing after 1866, since students from Trieste (and in general the Italians who were subjects of Vienna) saw now interpose the border between them and the Italian universities of Padua, where he was previously used to go to school. The legitimacy of the request to establish a university in Trieste Italian, but denied the grant is for fear of displeasing the Slovenian group or to see it put forward a similar request to the central Austrian was recognized in principle, because it is stipulated that a cultural center and studies of this type would eventually strengthen the Italian irredentism.

The labour issue

The largest city, industrial and commercial center of Trieste attracted an intense migratory movement from neighboring regions, and the empire, both the Italian state. They arrived well in the city of Trieste immigrants of many nationalities, including mainly Italians and Southern Slavs. They arose at the time of major concern in the Italian community on the possibility that the empire favored the Slav immigration in Trieste and at the same time sfavorisse Italian.
However, the Slav migratory movement in the direction of Trieste was first established for socio-economic reasons, since it had "basically to economic reasons and the attractive force exerted on the district by expanding cities." Slovenes were more easily work in public service in a mixed-language zone for reasons of linguistic and also were often well received by the Italian employers in sectors ranging from industrial to domestic work. The Sestan points out that the distrust of the imperial authorities towards immigrants Italians was due to the fact that they were citizens of a foreign state.
One must add, however, as recognized by Angelo Ara, that "undoubtedly existed an imperial interest in strengthening South-Slavic component, considered most loyal and" centripetal "of the Italian": this attitude was, for example, recognized by the Governor Hohenlohe in an official document. The Sestan notes for his part as the Austrian authorities would promote the Slavic migration from rural regions of Slovenia and Croatia and at the same time interfered with the migratory movement of Italians from the kingdom. To take a specific example, the Imperial Lieutenancy tried to include in the list of the drains of the port of Trieste of Slovenians living in other municipalities of the Karst and Upper Carniola. The imperial authorities showed themselves wary of the subjects of the Kingdom resorted immigrants and easy to expulsion measures against them, "the nationality of the Kingdom of Italy [...] was sufficient reason for the Austrian authorities did dell'Arme the face and when They believe appropriate, intervene with measures of forced eviction, with the most trivial pretexts; 35,000 would be about the expulsions of Italian subjects of the Kingdom in the decade from 1903 to 1913, ie up to the famous decrees of lieutenant Trieste Prince Conrad of Hohenlohe. "This contributed to exasperate the minds between the different ethnic groups. In 1913, after another decree of Prince Hohenlohe that included deportations of Italian, Slavic nationalist supporters held a rally the public against Italy, and then carry out a demonstration, shouting "Viva Hohenlohe! Down with Italy! ", Then trying to storm the Italian consulate.
The fastest grow the Slavic component in Trieste at the beginning of the twentieth century was then due to both social and economic reasons, both political empire and Hohenlohe (sympathizer for trialistiche positions above stated). The consequence, however, was that the Trieste city saw as eroding their Italian by immigration Slavic movement, without being able by itself to grow demographically so consideration. [24] Fears of Trieste Italian communities were at the beginning of the twentieth century increased the knowledge of what had happened in Dalmatia, with "the decline Dalmatian-ness" that is "dramatically perceived by other Adriatic and especially from Trieste, which they attribute to the aggressive expansionism South Slavic and governmental intervention, "so that they see in the situation of Dalmatia" almost the anticipation of what could happen in the future in Trieste. "

Irredentism and the Great War

As we have already had occasion to note, the italofobe directives of the Habsburg imperial government promoted a series repressive and discriminatory measures to the detriment of the Italian Trieste. However, they contributed in important ways to the spread of irredentist ideas within the Italian community who felt increasingly threatened in its very existence by the joint action of the Austrian Government and the local Slavic nationalists, among them allies in the anti-Italian function.

Trieste was, with Trento, object and at the same time the center of irredentism, movement that, in the last decades of the nineteenth century and early twentieth aspired to an annexation of the city to Italy. To irredentism Trieste food were mostly bourgeois rising classes (including the wealthy Jewish colony), whose potential and political aspirations could not find full satisfaction in the Austro-Hungarian Empire. For its part, as already indicated, the Slovene ethnic group was in the city of Trieste in the early twentieth century in full demographic growth, social and economic, and, according to the controversial census of 1910, was about a fourth of the entire population. Irredentism therefore assumed, in the Julian city, the characters often markedly anti-Slavs that were embodied by the figure of Roger Timeus.

First martyr of this movement is considered a Trieste, Guglielmo Oberdan, which, for plotting to kill the Austrian Emperor Franz Joseph, he was tried and hanged in his hometown 20 December 1882. Close to the Italian irredentist movement and perceived as such by the Austrian authorities, was the aforementioned National League, maximum Trieste organization of private nature of time, which grew to 11,569 members in 1912. On 23 May 1915, the news of the declaration of war on Austria-Hungary, were set on fire by pro-Austrian demonstrators, in addition to the headquarters of the National League, the Palazzo Tonello where he was preparing the irredentist newspaper "Il Piccolo" and the 'building of Gymnastics Triestina, irredentist sports association.

At the outbreak of World War I, Trieste refused to fight under the Austro-Hungarian flags, and, immediately after the entry into the war against the Central Powers, enlisted in the royal army. Among the 182 volunteers who lost their lives during the conflict, remember the writers and intellectuals Scipio Slataper, Roger Timeus and Stuparich Charles, brother of the famous Giani. Particularly active in terms of ideas and propaganda were the escapees from Trieste in Italy and France, where he played a major role in the foundation, in Rome, of a Central Committee of the Upper Adriatic propaganda (1916) and, in Paris, of 'association Italian unredeemed. All members of the governing bodies of the committee were from Trieste, with the exception of the Dalmatian ALESSANDRO DUDAN. On November 4, 1918 Italian troops entered finally in Trieste, met with overwhelming enthusiasm. "Almost the entire Italian population was in the street waiting liberators. Italian Army witnesses recall with emotion the enveloping embrace of Trieste, noting even the appearance gaunt and subdued crowd, submitted for the whole duration of the war to the same deprivations of Austria's population. "

Annexation to Italy

In that same month of November (1918), at the end of the First World War, Trieste was united with Italy. The formal annexation of the city and Venezia Giulia, however, came only two years later, between November 1920 and January 1921, when it became effective with the Treaty of Rapallo. With the annexation, the importance of the Julian metropolis was somewhat curtailed Trieste found himself border town with a much more limited hinterland than in the past. Its port had also lost the potential user base that had determined the development and that it was formed from the entire Austro-Hungarian Empire, statehood dissoltasi definitely. For paliare, at least partially, this situation, the Italian state put in place against the city and its province an assisted economy policy, initiated by the last government of Giovanni Giolitti (1920-1921), it lasted throughout the fascist period (1922–1943). The main effort was made in the industrial sector, which, in the intention of the legislators, was to replace the port and commercial activities related to it, such as flying economy Trieste.

See also
 Timeline of Trieste

References

Bibliography